Urania Giulia Rosina Papatheu (born 25 July 1965) is an Italian Senator from Forza Italia. She represents Sicily.

See also 

 List of current Italian senators

References 

Living people
1965 births
People from Sicily
Senators of Legislature XVIII of Italy
21st-century Italian women politicians
Forza Italia (2013) senators
20th-century Italian women
Women members of the Senate of the Republic (Italy)